The 2010–11 Union Dutchwomen women's hockey team will represent Union College in the 2010-11 NCAA Division I women's ice hockey season. The Dutchwomen are a member of the Eastern College Athletic Conference.

Offseason
June 7: Olympic silver medallist Julie Chu has been named as an assistant coach. Previously, Chu was assistant coach for the University of Minnesota Duluth women’s hockey team that won the 2008 NCAA National Championship.

Recruiting

Exhibition

Regular season
On January 14, Kate Gallagher made 41 saves despite losing to Colgate by a 1-0 score. It was the fourth time this season she had made over 40 saves. The one goal allowed against Colgate was the fewest goals allowed in one game dating back to 1998. The following day, she made 32 saves against the Cornell Big Red.

Standings

Schedule

Conference record

Awards and honors
Kate Gallagher, Union, MLX Skates Player of the Week (Week of  January 18, 2011)

See also
2009–10 Union Dutchwomen women's ice hockey season

References

External links
Official site

U
U
Union Dutchwomen ice hockey seasons